"We Don't Talk Anymore" is a song by American singer-songwriter Charlie Puth, featuring vocals from fellow American singer Selena Gomez. It was released on May 24, 2016, as the third single from Puth's debut studio album, Nine Track Mind. The artists wrote the song with Jacob Kasher Hindlin. Musically, it is a pop song with Puth's tropical-inspired production.

The song peaked at number nine on the US Billboard Hot 100, earning Puth his second top-10 single and Gomez's sixth and Puth's second highest-charting single as a lead artist to date, behind "Attention". It has also attained the top 10 positions in more than 20 countries, and reached number one in Italy, Lebanon and Romania.

Background
Puth created the guitar line during a trip in Japan. He produced the beat in the Philippines and recorded his vocals in Los Angeles. Months later Puth played the song for Selena Gomez, whom he had met previously at an after party following the MTV Video Music Awards. He thought that their voices would complement each other well and then asked her to sing the second verse. Gomez's vocals were recorded in Puth's closet. Her recording session lasted approximately 15 minutes. On December 10, 2015, Puth posted a snippet of the song announcing the collaboration with Gomez. On January 10, 2016, Puth posted a second teaser.

Composition
"We Don't Talk Anymore" is a pop song with a tropical-inspired production. The song is in the key of C  minor and has 100 beats per minute. Bobby Oliver of NJ.com described it as "a pulsing club jam." Lyrically, the song takes perspective from a former couple and their struggle to maintain a normal communication system in the aftermath of their break-up. Puth said the song is about "relationships where you're obsessed with that one person, but then you break it up peacefully, but it's changed. You can't talk to them like friends anymore. You can say you want to remain friends, but it's easier said than done. It’s heartbreaking. 'We Don't Talk Anymore' is basically the conversation a month after that type of breakup."

Critical reception
The song was met with critical acclaim from critics. Writing for Spin, Brennan Carley found the song "wisely trades verses between the two pop forces, cashing in on the trop-house trend" and added that it is "a worthy, breezy slice of pop." Bobby Oliver of NJ.com wrote the song is "wonderfully infectious, and feels destined for hit radio." MTV's Madeline Roth praised the singers' vocals by saying they "blend so beautifully together." Marie Sherman of Fuse said the song is "freaking catchy" and that the chorus would be stuck in people's heads. Lindsey Sullivan of Billboard called the song "ridiculously catchy". Idolator's Mike Wass opined that the song "sounds like a smash." Dee Lockett of Vulture.com deemed it "the chillest breakup duet."

Music videos

Live performance video
A live performance video was released on July 19, 2016. It features Puth and Gomez performing with the latter's Revival Tour in Anaheim, California on July 9.

Official video
The music video premiered on August 2, 2016, on BuzzFeed and was directed by Phil Pinto. It shows Puth and Mirella Cardoso as his love interest. This video does not include the appearance of Gomez, but only used the version of Puth and Gomez. As of October 2021, the video has more than 2.7 billion views and 12 million likes on YouTube and is the site's 32nd most-viewed video. It was nominated for Best Collaboration at 2017 MTV Video Music Awards but lost to Zayn and Taylor Swift's I Don't Wanna Live Forever.

Credits and personnel
 Charlie Puth – lead vocals, songwriter, producer
 Selena Gomez – featured vocals, songwriter
 Jacob Kasher Hindlin – songwriter

Charts

Weekly charts

Year-end charts

Certifications and sales

Release history

See also
 List of most-viewed YouTube videos
 List of Airplay 100 number ones of the 2010s

References

External links
 

2015 songs
Atlantic Records singles
Charlie Puth songs
Selena Gomez songs
Male–female vocal duets
Songs written by Charlie Puth
Songs written by Selena Gomez
Songs written by Jacob Kasher
Number-one singles in Romania
2016 singles